Karen Margrethe "Kamma" Rahbek, née Heger (19 October 1775 – 21 January 1829) was a Danish writer, salonist and lady of letters.

Biography 

Karen Margrethe Rahbek was born in Copenhagen, Denmark. She was the daughter of the official Hans Heger (1747–1819) and Anne Louise Drewsen (1751–1799).
She grew up in a wealthy home in Nørregade. She received a broad based education and could speak several languages including German, French, Spanish, Latin, Greek and Italian.

In 1798, she married the writer Knud Lyne Rahbek (1760–1830). Her husband was a writer, poet, literary historian and magazine editor.

Her salon at Bakkehuset became a cultural centre and the gathering place for the writers of the Danish Golden age and was considered the salon of the middle class in contrast to the more aristocratic Friederike Brun and Charlotte Schimmelmann.

Among her guests were Adam Gottlob Oehlenschläger, who was married to her sister Christiane Oehlenschläger (1782-1841). Other notable visitors included Jens Baggesen, Sophie Ørsted, Poul Martin Møller, N. F. S. Grundtvig, B. S. Ingemann, H. C. Andersen, Peter Oluf Brøndsted and Johan Ludvig Heiberg. Rahbek befriended the writers of the Romantic style, while her spouse preferred the moralists.

Kamma Rahbek was also a diligent writer. Several of her letters and memories have been published. She died in 1829 at Frederiksberg and was buried in Frederiksberg Ældre Kirkegård.

In popular culture 

 Kamma Rahbek (Karen Lykkehus) appears in Jeg har elsket og levet, a 1940 romantic musical about the composer C. E. F. Weyse directed by George Schnéevoigt, Kamma Rahbek.
 In 2011, øøKamma, a biographical novel by Maria Helleberg, was published.
 Her silhouette is used as the logo for Wikipedia's Women in Red initiative.

 See also 

 Sophia Magdalena Krag Juel Vind

 References 

 Other sources 

 Knud Lyne Rahbek: Erindringer af mit liv (Copenhagen: Jens Hostrup Schultz) 5 volumes published between 1824-29

 Related reading 

 Kirsten Dreyer (ed.) Kamma Rahbeks brevveksling med Chr. Molbech, 1–3 (Museum Tusculanums Forlag) 1994. 
 Maria Helleberg: Vilde kvinder, milde kvinder : 12 kvindeliv fra guldalderen  (Lindhardt og Ringhof) 2003. 
 Anne E. Jensen: Kamma Rahbek 1775–1828. I anledning af 200 års dagen den 19. oktober 1975 (Bakkehusmuseet by Historisk-Topografisk Selskab for Frederiksberg) 1975
 Hans Kyrre, Knud Lyne Rahbek og Kamma Rahbek og Livet paa Bakkehuset (H. Hagerups Forlag) 1929.
 Anne Scott Sørensen, "Blomsterpoesi – om Kamma Rahbek og Bakkehuset" in Nordisk salonkultur – et studie i nordiske skønånder og salonmiljøer 1780–1850'', Anne Scott Sørensen (ed.) (Odense Universitetsforlag) 1998. .

External links 

 Bakkehusmuseet website
 Source

1775 births
1829 deaths
18th-century Danish writers
19th-century Danish writers
Danish salon-holders
18th-century Danish women writers
19th-century Danish women writers
writers from Copenhagen
Danish socialites